Robert D. (Bob) Tarleck is a Canadian politician, who served as the 24th mayor of Lethbridge, Alberta, Canada, 2001-2011.

Biography

In 1957, Bob Tarleck won the Canadian record for the 100-yard-dash for boys fifteen and under. He was also the Vancouver city champion in 220-yard-dash, the 440-yard-dash and the hurdles the same year. He moved to Lethbridge nine  years later.

Tarleck spent his career as an educator, spending many years in the public school system and as a professor at the University of Lethbridge.

Tarleck and his wife Angela have two daughters and two grandsons.

Political career

From 1974–1992, Tarleck served on the Lethbridge City Council as an alderman. He temporarily retired from municipal politics for nine years until David B. Carpenter announced in 2001 he was not seeking a fifth term as mayor. The opening attracted four other candidates: Mike Pierzchala, Mark Switzer, Greg Weadick and Frank Peta. Tarleck easily defeated runner-up Pierzchala.

Tarleck garnered two thirds of the votes in the 2004 municipal election against his single opponent and former alderman, Joe Mauro. He was elected by acclamation in the 2007 election.

References

External links
City of Lethbridge - Mayor Biography

Mayors of Lethbridge
Living people
Year of birth missing (living people)
20th-century Canadian politicians
21st-century Canadian politicians